Canada competed at the 1996 Summer Olympics in Atlanta, United States, held from 19 July to 4 August 1996. 303 competitors, 152 men and 151 women, took part in 189 events in 25 sports.

Medalists

Archery

Canada sent three men to Atlanta for archery.  All were defeated in the first round of individual competition, as well as losing the first match of the team round together.

Men

Athletics

Men
Track and road events

Field events

Combined events – Decathlon

Women
Track and road events

Field events

Combined events – Heptathlon

Badminton

Basketball

Women's tournament

Team roster
 Bev Smith
 Karla Karch-Gailus
 Camille Thompson
 Sue Stewart
 Shawna Molcak
 Jodi Evans
 Cynthia Johnston
 Dianne Norman
 Martina Jerant
 Kelly Boucher
 Andrea Blackwell
 Marlelynn Lange-Harris
Preliminary round

Classification match 9th-12th place

11th place match

Boxing

Canoeing

Slalom

Sprint
Men

Women

Cycling

Road

Men

Women

Track

Sprints

Points races

Mountain biking

Diving

Men

Women

Equestrian

Dressage

Eventing

Jumping

Fencing

Seven fencers, all men, represented Canada in 1996.

Gymnastics

Artistic

Judo

Men's Competition
Extra-Lightweight (– 60 kg)
 Ewan Beaton

Half-Lightweight (– 66 kg)
 Taro Tan

Half-Middleweight (– 81 kg)
 Colin Morgan

Middleweight (– 90 kg)
 Nicolas Gill

Half-Heavyweight (– 100 kg)
 Keith Morgan

Women's Competition
Half-Lightweight (– 52 kg)
 Nathalie Gosselin

Lightweight (– 57 kg)
 Marie-Josée Morneau

Extra-Lightweight (– 60 kg)
 Carolyne Lepage

Half-Middleweight (– 63 kg)
 Michelle Buckingham

Half-Heavyweight (– 78 kg)
 Niki Jenkins

Heavyweight (+ 78 kg)
 Nancy Filteau

Rhythmic gymnastics

Rowing

Sailing

Women's Mistral One Design
 Caroll-Ann Alie
 Final – 57.0 (→ 12th place)

Shooting

Softball

Women's team competition
Preliminary round Robin
Defeated Chinese Taipei (2:1)
Defeated Puerto Rico (0:4)
Lost to PR China (1:2)
Lost to Japan (0:4)
Lost to United States (2:4)
Defeated Netherlands (4:1)
Lost to Australia (2:5)
Semifinals
 did not advance → Fifth place
Team roster
Colleen Thorburn-Smith
Sandy Beasley
Juanita Clayton
Karen Doell
Carrie Flemmer
Kelly Kelland
Kara McGaw
Pauline Maurice
Candace Murray
Christine Parris
Lori Sippel
Karen Snelgrove
Debbie Sonnenberg
Alecia Stephenson
Carmie Vairo
Head coach: Lesle Kennedy

Swimming

Men's 50 m freestyle
 Hugues Legault
 Heat – 23.63 (→ did not advance, 39th place)

Men's 100 m freestyle
 Stephen Clarke
 Heat – 50.14
 B-Final – 50.45 (→ 15th place)

Men's 100 m Backstroke
 Robert Braknis
 Heat – 56.14
 B-Final – 57.00 (→ 16th place)
 Chris Renaud
 Heat – 56.52 (→ did not advance, 18th place)

Men's 200 m Backstroke
 Chris Renaud
 Heat – 2:02.48
 B-Final – 2:01.70 (→ 10th place)

Men's 100 m Breaststroke
 Jonathan Cleveland
 Heat – 1:03.14 (→ did not advance, 23rd place)

Men's 200 m Breaststroke
 Jonathan Cleveland
 Heat – 2:16.08
 B-Final – 2:16.39 (→ 15th place)

Men's 100 m Butterfly
 Stephen Clarke
 Heat – 53.41
 Final – 53.33 (→ 7th place)
 Edward Parenti
 Heat – 54.03
 B-Final – 54.19 (→ 15th place)

Men's 200 m Butterfly
 Casey Barrett
 Heat – 2:00.28
 B-Final – 1:59.72 (→ 11th place)

Men's 200 m Individual Medley
 Curtis Myden
 Heat – 2:01.50
 Final – 2:01.13 (→  Bronze medal)

Men's 400 m Individual Medley
 Curtis Myden
 Heat – 4:18.43
 Final – 4:16.28 (→  Bronze medal)

Men's 4 × 100 m Medley Relay
 Robert Braknis, Jonathan Cleveland, Edward Parenti, and Stephen Clarke
 Heat – 3:42.95 (→ did not advance, 12th place)

Women's 50 m freestyle
 Martine Dessureault
 Heat – 26.44 (→ did not advance, 26th place)
 Laura Nicholls
 Heat – 26.52 (→ did not advance, 30th place)

Women's 100 m freestyle
 Shannon Shakespeare
 Heat – 56.63 (→ did not advance, 17th place)

Women's 200 m freestyle
 Joanne Malar
 Heat – 2:03.53
 B-Final – 2:03.79 (→ 16th place)

Women's 400 m freestyle
 Andrea Schwartz
 Heat – 4:19.46 (→ did not advance, 20th place)

Women's 800 m freestyle
 Nikki Dryden
 Heat – 8:47.19 (→ did not advance, 14th place)
 Stephanie Richardson
 Heat – 8:52.61 (→ did not advance, 19th place)

Women's 100 m Backstroke
 Julie Howard
 Heat – 1:03.84
 B-Final – 1:04.01 (→ 15th place)

Women's 200 m Backstroke
 Julie Howard
 Heat – 2:17.25 (→ did not advance, 20th place)

Women's 100 m Breaststroke
 Guylaine Cloutier
 Heat – 1:09.72
 Final – 1:09.40 (→ 6th place)
 Lisa Flood
 Heat – 1:10.26
 B-Final – 1:10.21 (→ 10th place)

Women's 200 m Breaststroke
 Christin Petelski
 Heat – 2:30.30
 Final – 2:31.45 (→ 8th place)
 Riley Mants
 Heat – 2:31.97
 B-Final – scratched

Women's 100 m Butterfly
 Sarah Evanetz
 Heat – 1:01.32
 B-Final – 1:01.44 (→ 15th place)
 Jessica Amey
 Heat – 1:02.81 (→ did not advance, 25th place)

Women's 200 m Butterfly
 Jessica Deglau
 Heat – 2:12.48
 Final – 2:11.40 (→ 6th place)
 Andrea Schwartz
 Heat – 2:13.33
 B-Final – 2:14.07 (→ 15th place)

Women's 200 m Individual Medley
 Marianne Limpert
 Heat – 2:15.12
 Final – 2:14.35 (→  Silver medal)
 Joanne Malar
 Heat – 2:16.34
 Final – 2:15.30 (→ 4th place)

Women's 400 m Individual Medley
 Joanne Malar
 Heat – 4:47.85
 B-Final – 4:46.34 (→ 9th place)
 Nancy Sweetnam
 Heat – 4:48.56
 B-Final – 4:47.55 (→ 11th place)

Women's 4 × 100 m freestyle Relay
 Shannon Shakespeare, Julie Howard, Andrea Moody, and Marianne Limpert
 Heat – 3:45.66
 Final – 3:46.27 (→ 7th place)

Women's 4 × 200 m freestyle Relay
 Joanne Malar, Sophie Simard, Marianne Limpert, and Jessica Deglau
 Heat – 8:12.03
 Marianne Limpert, Shannon Shakespeare, Andrea Schwartz, and Jessica Deglau
 Final – 8:08.16 (→ 5th place)

Women's 4 × 100 m Medley Relay
 Julie Howard, Guylaine Cloutier, Sarah Evanetz, and Shannon Shakespeare
 Heat – 4:09.50
 Final – 4:08.29 (→ 5th place)

Synchronized swimming

Table tennis

Tennis

Men's Doubles Competition
 Grant Connell and Daniel Nestor
 First round – defeated Ján Krošlák and Karol Kučera (Slovakia) 6–3, 6-3
 Second round – lost to Neil Broad and Tim Henman (Great Britain) 6–7, 6–4, 4-6

Women's Singles Competition
 Patricia Hy-Boulais
 First round – defeated Rita Grande (Italy) 6-4 6-4
 Second round – lost to Monica Seles (United States) 3-6 2-6

Volleyball

Women's indoor team competition
Preliminary round (group B)
 Lost to Cuba (0-3)
 Lost to Russia (0-3)
 Lost to Germany (0-3)
 Lost to Brazil (0-3)
 Defeated Peru (3-2)
Quarterfinals
 did not advance (→ Ninth place)
Team roster
Kerri Buchberger
Josee Corbeil
Wanda Guenette
Janis Kelly
Lori Ann Mundt
Diane Ratnik
Erminia Russo
Michelle Sawatzky
Brigitte Soucy
Christine Stark
Kathy Tough
Katrina Von Sass
Head coach: Mike Burchuk

Weightlifting

Men's Light-Heavyweight
Serge Tremblay
 Final – 150.0 + 177.5 = 327.5 (→ 13th place)

Wrestling

References

External links

Nations at the 1996 Summer Olympics
1996
Summer Olympics